The Centre Marcel Dionne is a 4,000 capacity (3,038 seated) multi-purpose arena in Drummondville, Quebec, Canada. It is home to the Drummondville Voltigeurs Ice hockey team. It is named in honour of Marcel Dionne. It was built in 1963 and was originally called the Centre Civique.

References

Sport in Drummondville
Indoor arenas in Quebec
Indoor ice hockey venues in Quebec
Quebec Major Junior Hockey League arenas
Sports venues in Quebec
Buildings and structures in Centre-du-Québec
Sports venues completed in 1963
1963 establishments in Quebec